Qalet Marku Battery, also known as D'Orbeau Battery, was an artillery battery in Baħar iċ-Ċagħaq, limits of Naxxar, Malta. It was built in 1715–1716 by the Order of Saint John as one of a series of coastal fortifications around the Maltese Islands. The battery has been largely destroyed, but some remains can still be seen.

History
Qalet Marku Battery was built in 1715–1716 as part of the first building programme of coastal batteries in Malta. The nearest fortifications to the battery were Saint Mark's Tower to the north, Qalet Marku Redoubt to the west (now demolished) and Baħar iċ-Ċagħaq Redoubt to the east. Construction of the battery cost 1165 scudi.

The battery originally consisted of a pentagonal gun platform with an embrasured parapet wall. A rectangular blockhouse was located in the centre of the battery, while the entire structure was surrounded by a rock-hewn ditch.

The battery was still in good condition until the first half of the 20th century. It seems to have been severely damaged before or during World War II. At this point, a concrete bunker was built on one side of the ruined battery.

Present day
Today, only the ditch and part of the scarp wall are still visible, although they are covered in vegetation. Despite this, the site is considered to have significant archaeological potential if properly excavated and studied.

References

External links

National Inventory of the Cultural Property of the Maltese Islands

Batteries in Malta
Hospitaller fortifications in Malta
Military installations established in 1715
Buildings and structures demolished in the 20th century
Ruins in Malta
Naxxar
Limestone buildings in Malta
National Inventory of the Cultural Property of the Maltese Islands
18th-century fortifications
1715 establishments in Malta
18th Century military history of Malta